Yeungjin High School is a high school located in Daegu, South Korea.

Principles
Its motto is "Let's endeavor steadily sincerely". The educational goals are described in five components: First, to grow an honest and faithful democratic citizen as making faithfully moral education. Second, to grow the person who study by oneself developing independent ability. Third, to grow the person who investigate with scientific attitude. Fourth, to grow a person who has dignity as habit sound life attitude. Fifth, to grow harmonious person strengthening minds and bodies.

History
The establishment of the school was approved on 11 February 1972, and the first entrance ceremony was done on 4 March 1972.

References

External links
Official Website

Educational institutions established in 1972
High schools in Daegu
Boys' schools in South Korea